Willert is a German language  surname derived from a given name composed of the elements wil "will, desire" and hard "hardy, brave, strong". Notable people with the name include:
 Arthur Willert (1882–1973), British journalist and public servant
 Benedikt Willert (2001), German professional footballer
 Eveline Willert Cunnington (1849–1916), British-born social reformer, feminist, lecturer and writer 
 Paul Willert (1901–1988), German musicologist and baritone singer
 Paul Ferdinand Willert (1844–1912), English author 
 Thomas Willert Beale (1828–1894), English miscellaneous writer

See also 
 Willard (name)

References 

German-language surnames
Surnames from given names